Ravand is a village in West Azerbaijan Province, Iran.

Ravand may also refer to:
Ravand Institute
Ravand-e Olya, Hamadan, Hamadan Province
Ravand-e Vosta, Hamadan Province
Ravand-e Olya, West Azerbaijan, West Azerbaijan Province
Ravand-e Sofla, West Azerbaijan Province